Ram Kapoor (born 1 September 1973) is an Indian actor who works in films and television serials. He gained popularity portraying Jai Walia in the television series Kasamh Se and the character of Ram Kapoor in Bade Achhe Lagte Hain. He played triple role Mamaji Kunwar Amar Nath Singh (KANS), Johnny and Balbir in the Bollywood film Humshakals and hosted the reality show Rakhi Ka Swayamwar, based loosely on The Bachelorette.

He won 3 ITA Awards and 3 Indian Telly Awards for best actor.

Early life and education
He spent his formative years at the Sherwood College, in Nainital, Uttarakhand. At Sherwood College, Kapoor was introduced to acting, when as a challenge and an order from his head captain he auditioned for the annual school theatrical production of Charley's Aunt and performed the lead role. Under the direction and tutelage of Amir Raza Hussein, Kapoor found his career path and realised his love for acting.

After completing his tenth board exams, Kapoor studied at the Kodaikanal International School. After his graduation, Kapoor decided to join the entertainment industry and left for Los Angeles in the United States with the intention of joining UCLA to study filmmaking but joined a Stanislavski-based acting academy in Los Angeles.

Career 
Kapoor made his onscreen debut with the television serial Nyaay (1997). He took up three more shows Heena  (1998), Sangharsh (1999) and Kavita (2000).

In 2000, Kapoor acted in popular family drama Ghar Ek Mandir. Kapoor worked with Amir Raza Hussein once again in the play The Fifty Days of War – Kargil which ran for 10 days in New Delhi as a tribute to the heroes of the Kargil War. Ram played five characters.

In 2001, Kapoor acted in Rishtey, in the serial Kabhi Aaye Na Judaai and made a cameo appearance in Mira Nair's acclaimed film Monsoon Wedding.

He went on to appear in films like Dhadkan (2003) and Awaz - Dil Se Dil Tak, followed by Hazaaron Khwaishein Aisi and Bali (2004), a telefilm in which he played Prithvi Singh.

In 2005, Kapoor's was seen in films like Devaki, Kal: Yesterday and Tomorrow and Missed Call.

In 2006, he starred in the show Kasamh Se in the role of Jai Udai Walia.

Kapoor was then seen in the soap opera Basera and participated in two reality shows: Jhalak Dikhhla Jaa as a participant and Rakhi Ka Swayamwar as the host.

Kapoor appeared in minor roles in two films in 2010. The first was the commercially successful Karthik Calling Karthik, with Kapoor playing the role of Kamath Sir. The second, Udaan, was a critically acclaimed and award-winning film directed by Vikrmaditya Motwane and was produced by Anurag Kashyap.

In 2011, he starred on the TV show Bade Achhe Lagte Hain and played the male protagonist Ram Amarnath Kapoor. The show was an instant success and Kapoor's performance was lauded.

He appeared in Bollywood movies Agent Vinod (2012),  Student Of The Year (2012) and Humshakals (2014).

Personal life 

Kapoor is married to his Ghar Ek Mandir costar and actress Gautami Kapoor (née Gadgil). They met on the sets of the show and dated for a while before marrying on Valentines Day in 2003. They have two children.

Filmography

Television and web series

Films

Awards

See also
List of Indian television actors
List of Indian film actors
List of accolades received by Bade Achhe Lagte Hain

References

External links

 
 

1973 births
Living people
Indian male television actors
Indian male film actors
Male actors in Hindi cinema
Male actors from Mumbai
Punjabi people
Indian male soap opera actors
Use dmy dates from January 2013
People from Jalandhar